Ignacio Rodríguez Bahena (born 12 July 1956) is a Mexican former professional football goalkeeper who played for Mexico in the 1986 FIFA World Cup.

See also
List of people from Morelos, Mexico

References

External links

1956 births
Mexico international footballers
Footballers from Morelos
Association football goalkeepers
Liga MX players
Atlético Morelia players
Atlante F.C. footballers
Tigres UANL footballers
1986 FIFA World Cup players
Mexican football managers
C.D. Veracruz managers
Living people
Mexican footballers